The 1874 Grand National was the 36th renewal of the renewal of the Grand National horse race that took place at Aintree near Liverpool, England, on 26 March 1874.

Finishing Order

Non-finishers

References

 1874
Grand National
Grand National
19th century in Lancashire